is a Japanese manga series written and illustrated by Kenichiro Nagao. It was serialized in Shogakukan's seinen manga magazine Monthly Big Comic Spirits between January 2019 and August 2022, with its chapters collected in seven tankōbon volumes.

Publication
Shogakukan collected its chapters in seven tankōbon volumes, released from September 30, 2019, to September 30, 2022.

Volume list

References

External links
 

Martial arts anime and manga
Seinen manga
Shogakukan manga